Bùi Thanh Liêm (June 30, 1949 - September 26, 1981)  was a Vietnamese cosmonaut.

Born in Hanoi, Vietnam, he was a pilot for the Vietnam People's Air Force who rose to the rank of captain and flew many combat missions during the Vietnam War. In 1978, Liêm graduated from  Gagarin Military Air Academy at Monino, Moscow Oblast, Russian Soviet Federative Socialist Republic, Soviet Union.

Liêm was selected as backup of Phạm Tuân, who was the first Vietnamese and the first Asian in space on the Soyuz 37 mission. In 1981, he was killed in a MiG-21 aeroplane crash during a training flight over the Gulf of Tonkin, off the coast of northern Vietnam under suspicious circumstances. It has been suggested that his plane was accidentally shot down by a RIM-66 Standard surface to air missile fired by the USS Thomas S. Gates (CG-51).

External links
Spacefacts biography of Bui Thanh Liem

1949 births
1981 deaths
Aviators killed in aviation accidents or incidents
North Vietnamese military personnel of the Vietnam War
People from Hanoi
Space program fatalities
Vietnamese aviators
Vietnamese astronauts
Vietnamese expatriates in the Soviet Union
Victims of aviation accidents or incidents in 1981